Richard "Dick" Lehman (12 June 1923–17 February 2007) joined the Central Intelligence Agency in 1949 and served for 33 years before retiring. As a junior analyst, he worked in the General Division of the Office of Reports and Estimates (ORE) using SIGINT to puzzle out the organization and output of various Soviet industrial ministries. He then spent much of his career in the Office of Current Intelligence (OCI), eventually serving as its director from 1970 to 1975. Lehman also served as Director of the Office of Strategic Research from 1975 to 1976, as Deputy to the DCI for National Intelligence from 1976 to 1977, and as chairman of the National Intelligence Council from 1979 to 1981. 

Lehman developed the President's Intelligence Check List (PICL, pronounced "pickle") for President John F. Kennedy in June 1961.  The PICL ultimately became the President's Daily Brief.

Born in St. Louis on June 12, 1923, Lehman was the son of Edwin and Margaret Maxwell Lehman. His wife of 54 years, the former Diane Harris, died in 2002.

References 
 (Late Edition - Final)

Publisher: The Center for the Study of Intelligence (CIA).  Perhaps available from the US GPO.
 (Edition F)

1923 births
2007 deaths
Analysts of the Central Intelligence Agency
Harvard University alumni
University of Virginia alumni